L'Univers illustré was a French language weekly periodical published in Paris, France, between 1858 and 1900.

History and profile
L'Univers illustré was established by Michel Lévy (1821–1875) and after Michel's death taken over by his brother Calmann, who went on to become the founder of the Calmann-Lévy publishing house. The magazine was merged with La Vie illustrée in 1900.

References

Jean-Pierre Bacot, La presse illustrée au XIXe siècle: une histoire oubliée, Presses Univ. Limoges, 2005.

External links

 WorldCat Profile

1858 establishments in France
1900 disestablishments in France
Defunct magazines published in France
French-language magazines
Magazines established in 1858
Magazines disestablished in 1900
Magazines published in Paris
Weekly magazines published in France